Charles Gardiner (1720–1769) was an Irish landowner and politician.

Charles or Charlie Gardiner may also refer to:
Charlie Gardiner (Australian footballer) (born 1983), Australian rules footballer
Charlie Gardiner (footballer, born 1915) (1915–1973), Scottish footballer
Charlie Gardiner (ice hockey) (1904–1934), ice hockey goalie with Chicago
Charles Gardiner, 1st Earl of Blessington (1782–1829), Irish earl

See also
Charles Gardner (disambiguation)
Charles Gairdner (1898–1983), British Army general
Gardiner (surname)